South Bathurst is a suburb of Bathurst, New South Wales, Australia, in the Bathurst Region.

References

Bathurst, New South Wales